Abdul Rahman Majeed al-Rubaie (12 August 1939 – 20 March 2023) was an Iraqi author. He is one of the best-known writers in modern Iraqi literature. A collection of his stories has been translated into German as Solange die Sonne noch scheint.

Bibliography
 Al-Washmu (The Tattoo Mark)
 Al-Qamaru wal Aswar (The Moon and The Fences) 
 Al-Anhar (The Rivers) 
 Al-Afwah (The Mouths) 
 Ẓilalun Tunisiya (Tunisian Shades) 
 Al-Khuruju Min Baytil Taʿa (Leaving The House of Obedience) 
 Ḥadatha Haḏa Fi Laylatin Tunisiyatin (This Happened on A Tunisian Night) 
 Ayyatu Ḥayatin Hiya? (What Kind of Life Is It?) 
 Sirrul Maa’ (Water’s Secret) 
 Al-Mawasimul Okhra (Other Seasons) 
 Khuṭuṭul Ṭul... Khuṭuṭul ʿArḍ (Vertical Lines... Horizontal Lines) 
 As-Sayfu Wal Safina (The Sword and The Ship) 
 Hunaka Fi Fajjul Riḥ (There in The Wind)

References

1939 births
2023 deaths
Iraqi literature
Iraqi writers
People from Nasiriyah